Robert Arthur Moog (May 23, 1934 – August 21, 2005) was an American engineer and electronic music pioneer. He was the founder of the synthesizer manufacturer Moog Music and the inventor of the first commercial synthesizer, the Moog synthesizer, which debuted in 1964. In 1970, Moog released a more portable model, the Minimoog, described as the most famous and influential synthesizer in history. Among Moog's honors are a Technical Grammy Award, received in 2002, and an induction into the National Inventors Hall of Fame.

Robert "Bob" Moog is the subject of the biography, Switched On: Bob Moog and the Synthesizer Revolution, by Albert Glinsky, with a Foreword by Francis Ford Coppola (Oxford University Press, 2022).  The book is the first to traverse Moog's entire life and career.  Moog contributed the Foreword to Glinsky's first book, Theremin: Ether Music and Espionage, the definitive portrait of the life and work of Leon Theremin, who was a principle inspiration to Moog.

By 1963, Moog had been designing and selling theremins for several years, while working towards a PhD in engineering physics at Cornell University. He developed his synthesizer in response to demand for more practical and affordable electronic music equipment, guided by suggestions and requests from composers. Moog's principal innovation was the voltage-controlled oscillator, which uses voltage to control pitch. He also introduced fundamental synthesizer concepts such as modularity, envelope generation and the pitch wheel. He is credited for bringing synthesizers to a wider audience and influencing the development of popular music. 

Moog pursued his work as a hobby, and he is regarded as a poor businessman. His only patent was on his filter design; commentators have speculated that he would have become extremely wealthy had he patented his other innovations, but that their availability in the public domain helped the synthesizer industry flourish.

In 1971, Moog sold Moog Music to Norlin Musical Instruments, where he remained as a designer until 1977. In 1978, he founded the company Big Briar, and in 2002 renamed it Moog Music after buying back the rights to the name. In later years, Moog taught at the University of North Carolina at Asheville, and worked on designs for further instruments. He died at the age of 71 from a brain tumor.

Early life and education 
Robert Moog was born in New York City on May 23, 1934, and grew up in the Flushing neighborhood of Queens. He graduated from the Bronx High School of Science in 1952.

When he was a boy, Moog's parents forced him to study the piano, but he preferred spending his time in the workroom of his father, a Consolidated Edison engineer. He became fascinated by the theremin, an electronic instrument controlled by moving the hands over radio antennae. In 1949, aged 14, he built a theremin from plans printed in Electronics World.

Moog received a Bachelor of Science in physics from Queens College of the City University of New York and a Bachelor of Science in electrical engineering from the Columbia University School of Engineering and Applied Science under a 3-2 engineering program in 1957. He earned a PhD in engineering physics from Cornell University in 1965.

Career

RA Moog
In 1953, Moog produced his own theremin design, and the following year he published an article on the theremin in Radio and Television News. In the same year, he founded RA Moog, selling theremins and theremin kits by mail order from his home as he completed his education. One of his customers, Raymond Scott, rewired Moog's theremin for control by keyboard, creating the Clavivox.

Moog synthesizer 

At Cornell, Moog began work on his first synthesizer components with the composer Herb Deutsch. At the time, synthesizers were enormous, room-filling instruments; Moog hoped to build a more compact synthesizer that would appeal to musicians. He believed that practicality and affordability were the most important parameters.

In 1964, Moog began creating the Moog synthesizer. It was composed of separate modules which created and shaped sounds, connected by patch cords. Previous synthesizers, such as the RCA Mark II, had created sound from hundreds of vacuum tubes. Instead, Moog used recently available silicon transistors — specifically, transistors with an exponential relationship between input voltage and output current. With these, he created the voltage-controlled oscillator (VCO), which generated a waveform whose pitch could be adjusted by changing the voltage. Similarly, he used voltage to control loudness with voltage-controlled amplifiers (VCAs). One innovative feature was its envelope, which controlled how notes swell and fade. According to the Guardian, Moog's 1964 paper Voltage-Controlled Music Modules, in which he proposed the Moog synthesizer modules, invented the modern concept of the analog synthesizer.

Moog debuted the instrument at the 1964 Audio Engineering Society convention in New York. It was much smaller than other synthesizers, such as the RCA Synthesizer introduced a decade earlier, and much cheaper, at US$10,000 compared to the six-figure sums of other synthesizers. Whereas the RCA Synthesizer was programmed with punchcards, Moog's synthesizer could be played via keyboard, making it attractive to musicians. New Scientist described it as the first commercial synthesizer.

Moog described himself as a toolmaker, designing things for his users, not himself. His development was driven by requests and suggestions from various musicians, including Deutsch (who devised the instrument's keyboard interface), Richard Teitelbaum, Vladimir Ussachevsky and Wendy Carlos. His other early customers included choreographer Alwin Nikolais and composer John Cage. Universities established electronic music laboratories with Moog synthesizers. The Moog synthesizer was followed in 1970 by a more portable model, the Minimoog, described as the most famous and influential synthesizer in history.

Company decline 
Though commentators have praised Moog's engineering abilities, they described him as a poor businessman. Moog had pursued the development of his synthesizer as a hobby; he stressed that he was not a businessman, and had not known what a balance sheet was. He likened the experience to riding theme park amusements: "You know you're not going to get hurt too badly because nobody would let you do that, but you're not quite in control."

Moog only patented his filter design; David Borden, one of the first users of the Minimoog, felt that if Moog had patented his pitch wheel design he would have become extremely wealthy. According to Sound on Sound, if Moog had created a monopoly on other synthesizer ideas he created, such as modularity, envelope generation and voltage control, "it's likely the synth industry as we know it today would never have happened".

Beginning in 1971, Moog Music took on investors, merged with Norlin Musical Instruments, and moved to "less than ideal" premises near Buffalo, New York, amid a debilitating recession. Moog remained employed as a designer at the company until 1977. He said he would have left earlier if his contract had not required him to remain employed there for four years to cash his stock. By the end of the decade, Moog Music was facing competition from cheaper, easier-to-use instruments by competitors including Arp, Aries, Roland and E-mu.

Big Briar, return of Moog Music 

In 1978, Moog moved to North Carolina and founded a new electronic instrument company, Big Briar. He also worked as a consultant and vice president for new product research at Kurzweil Music Systems from 1984 to 1988. In the early 1990s, he was a research professor of music at the University of North Carolina at Asheville. In 2002, he renamed Big Briar to Moog Music after buying back the rights to the name. In later years, he continued to design electronic instruments, including a touchscreen-operated piano.

Personal life and death
Moog's first marriage, to Shirleigh Moog, ended in divorce in 1994. He was survived by his second wife, Ileana, four children, one stepdaughter, and five grandchildren.

Moog was diagnosed with a glioblastoma multiforme brain tumor on April 28, 2005. He died on August 21, 2005, at the age of 71 in Asheville, North Carolina.

Legacy
Moog has had a lasting influence on music. The BBC describes him as a pioneer of synthesized sound. According to the Guardian, his inventions "changed the complexion of the pop and classical music worlds". Moog's name became so associated with electronic music that it was sometimes used as a generic term for any synthesizer. In 2004, Moog was the subject of Moog, a documentary by Hans Fjellestad, who said in 2004 that Moog "embodies the archetypal American maverick inventor".

Moog's awards include honorary doctorates from Polytechnic Institute of New York University (New York City), Lycoming College (Williamsport, Pennsylvania), and Berklee College of Music. Moog received a Grammy Trustees Award for lifetime achievement in 1970. He received the Polar Music Prize in 2001 and a Special Merit/Technical Grammy Award in 2002. In 2012, to celebrate Moog's birthday, Google created an interactive version of the Minimoog as its Google Doodle. In 2013, Moog was inducted into the National Inventors Hall of Fame.

Museum

On July 18, 2013, Moog's widow Ileana Grams-Moog said she planned to give her husband's archives, maintained by the Bob Moog Foundation, to Cornell University. The foundation offered her $100,000, but Grams-Moog said she would not sell them. She said Cornell could provide better access for researchers, and that the foundation had not made enough progress toward a planned museum to be worthy of keeping the collection. The foundation responded that it had sufficiently preserved the collection and made efforts to improve storage, though it could not yet afford to build the museum.

In August 2019, the Bob Moog Foundation opened the Moogseum, a museum dedicated to Moog's work, in Asheville, North Carolina. The displays include rare theremins, prototype synthesizer modules and Moog's documents.

References

External links

 Moog Music — official website
 The Bob Moog Memorial Foundation for Electronic Music
The Moogseum
 Robert Moog discography at Discogs
 Moog Archives illustrated history of company and products
 Moog resources bibliography

1934 births
2005 deaths
Analog electronics engineers
Berklee College of Music alumni
Columbia School of Engineering and Applied Science alumni
Cornell University College of Engineering alumni
Engineers from New York City
Inventors of musical instruments
People from Queens, New York
Queens College, City University of New York alumni
The Bronx High School of Science alumni
University of North Carolina at Asheville faculty
American Jews
Jewish engineers
American inventors
American engineers